Anaulacus is a genus of beetles in the family Carabidae, containing the following species:

 Anaulacus adelioides W.S.Macleay, 1825 
 Anaulacus afganus (Jedlicka, 1956) 
 Anaulacus africanus (Alluaud, 1915) 
 Anaulacus ampliusculus (Chaudoir, 1876) 
 Anaulacus arrowi (Jedlicka, 1934)  
 Anaulacus ashei Ball & Shpeley, 2002 
 Anaulacus batesi (Chaudoir, 1876)  
 Anaulacus bonariensis (Chaudoir, 1876) 
 Anaulacus capensis Peringuey, 1896 
 Anaulacus carinatipennis Peringuey, 1908 
 Anaulacus ciliatus (Mutchler, 1934) 
 Anaulacus erwini Ball & Shpeley, 2002 
 Anaulacus exiguus Ball & Shpeley, 2002 
 Anaulacus fasciatus (Schmidt-Goebel, 1846) 
 Anaulacus fuscipennis (Schmidt-Goebel, 1846) 
 Anaulacus guineensis (Chaudoir, 1876)  
 Anaulacus humeralis Ball & Shpeley, 2002 
 Anaulacus humilis Schmidt-Goebel, 1846 
 Anaulacus hypolithoides (Vinson, 1935) 
 Anaulacus madagascariensis (Chaudoir, 1850) 
 Anaulacus mcclevei Ball & Shpeley, 2002 
 Anaulacus mocquerysi (Chaudoir, 1878) 
 Anaulacus opaculus (C.Zimmermann, 1834) 
 Anaulacus piceolus (Chaudoir, 1876) 
 Anaulacus pleuronectes (C.Zimmermann, 1834) 
 Anaulacus quadrimaculatus (Schmidt-Goebel, 1846) 
 Anaulacus rubidus (Andrewes, 1922) 
 Anaulacus ruficornis (Chaudoir, 1850) 
 Anaulacus rutilus (Schaum, 1863) 
 Anaulacus sericatus Chaudoir, 1846 Co
 Anaulacus sericipennis W.S.Macleay, 1825 
 Anaulacus siamensis Chaudoir, 1876 
 Anaulacus sphaeridioides (Burgeon, 1936)
 Anaulacus submaculatus (Bates, 1892) 
 Anaulacus thoracicus Ball & Shpeley, 2002 
 Anaulacus tuberculatus Chaudoir, 1876 
 Anaulacus whiteheadi Ball & Shpeley, 2002

References

Lebiinae